Harlan Township, one of the eleven townships of Warren County, Ohio, United States, and the last to be formed in that county, is located in the southeast corner of the county.  The 2000 census found 3,627 inhabitants, up from 3,268 in 1990; of this total, 3,240 lived in the unincorporated portions of the township.

Geography

Located in the southeastern corner of the county, it borders the following townships:
Washington Township - north
Vernon Township, Clinton County - northeast
Marion Township, Clinton County - east
Wayne Township, Clermont County - southeast
Goshen Township, Clermont County - southwest
Hamilton Township - west
Salem Township - northwest

The two tiny villages of Butlerville and Pleasant Plain are located in Harlan Township, as well as the unincorporated community of Level.

Name and history
The only Harlan Township statewide, it is named for Aaron Harlan of Xenia, a member of the Ohio General Assembly that created the township and who formerly represented the area in Congress.

Harlan Township was organized in 1860.  It was created by the Ohio General Assembly by the Act of March 16, 1860 (Ohio Laws, volume 57, page 135), which took effect that day.  It divided the existing Salem Township into two parts, the northern part to be called Corwin Township, the southern to be called Harlan.  The dividing line was to "commence at a point in the west bank of Todd's Fork where it intersects the line dividing the townships of Salem and Washington in said county, thence down Todd's Fork with the meanderings thereof, to the mouth of Second Creek; thence in a straight line to the mouth of Wolf's Run; thence up said run to the forks thereof; thence up the west fork of said run to the line dividing the lands of Robert C. Shurts and Allison Mounts; thence on a direct line to a point where the county road leading from Rossburg to Camargo crosses the line dividing the townships of Hamilton and Salem..."

Government
The township is governed by a three-member board of trustees, who are elected in November of odd-numbered years to a four-year term beginning on the following January 1.  Two are elected in the year after the presidential election and one is elected in the year before it.  There is also an elected township fiscal officer, who serves a four-year term beginning on April 1 of the year after the election, which is held in November of the year before the presidential election.  Vacancies in the fiscal officership or on the board of trustees are filled by the remaining trustees.

Public services
The Little Miami, Blanchester, Goshen, and Clinton Massie school districts serve the township.  Mail is delivered through the Pleasant Plain, Morrow, Goshen, and Blanchester post offices.  The Little Miami Telephone Company's Butlerville exchange serves most of the township, but parts of Harlan Township lie in the Little Miami, Blanchester, Morrow, and Clarksville telephone exchanges.

References

External links
County website

Townships in Warren County, Ohio
1860 establishments in Ohio
Townships in Ohio